Weeping trees are trees characterized by soft, limp twigs. This characterization may lead to a bent crown and pendulous branches that can cascade to the ground. While weepyness occurs in nature, most weeping trees are cultivars. Because of their shape, weeping trees are popular in landscaping; generally they need a lot of space and are solitary so that their effect is more pronounced. There are over a hundred different types of weeping trees. Some trees, such as the cherry, have a variety of weeping cultivars.
There are currently around 550 weeping cultivars in 75 different genera, although many have now disappeared from cultivation.

List of weeping trees

Weeping conifers

 Cedrus atlantica 'Glauca Pendula', Weeping Blue Atlas Cedar
 Cupressus nootkatensis 'Pendula', Weeping Nootka Cypress
 Cupressus nootkatensis 'Pendula Vera', True Weeping Nootka Cypress
 Cupressus sempervirens 'Pendula', Weeping Mediterranean Cypress
 Juniperus virginiana 'Pendula', Weeping Eastern Red Cedar
 Juniperus scopulorum 'Tolleson's Blue Weeping', Tolleson's Blue Weeping Juniper
 Larix decidua 'Pendula', Weeping European Larch
 Picea abies 'Inversa', Inversed Norway Spruce 
 Picea abies 'Pendula', Weeping Norway Spruce
 Picea breweriana, Brewer's Weeping Spruce
 Picea glauca 'Pendula', Weeping White Spruce
 Picea omorika 'Pendula', Weeping Serbian Spruce
 Pinus strobus 'Pendula', Weeping Eastern White Pine 
 Pinus patula, Mexican Weeping Pine
 Sequoiadendron giganteum 'Pendulum', Weeping giant sequoia

Weeping broadleaf trees

Acer campestre 'Eastleigh Weeping', Weeping Eastleigh Field Maple
 Acer campestre 'Pendulum', Weeping Field Maple
 Acer campestre 'Puncticulatum', Weeping Speckled Field Maple
 Acer negundo 'Pendulum', Weeping Boxelder Maple
 Acer platanoides 'Pendulum', Weeping Norway Maple
 Acer pseudoplatanus 'Pendulum', Weeping Sycamore
 Aesculus (Carnea Group) 'Pendula', Weeping Red Horse Chestnut
 Amorpha fruticosa 'Pendula', Weeping Desert False Indigo
 Aspidosperma quebracho-blanco 'Pendula', Weeping White Quebracho 
 Betula pendula 'Youngii', Young's Weeping Birch
 Betula pubescens 'Pendula', Weeping Downy Birch
 Betula pubescens 'Pendula Nana', Gazebo Downy Birch
 Cercidiphyllum japonicum 'Pendulum', Weeping Katsura 
 Fagus sylvatica 'Pendula', Weeping Beech
 Ficus benjamina, Weeping Fig
 Fraxinus angustifolia 'Pendula Vera', True Weeping Narrow-leafed Ash 
 Fraxinus excelsior 'Pendula', Weeping Ash 
 Ilex aquifolium 'Pendula', Weeping Holly
 Malus 'Louisa', 'Louisa' Weeping Crabapple 
 Melaleuca leucadendra, Weeping Tea tree
 Morus alba 'Chaparral', 'Chaparral' weeping Mulberry 
 Prunus itosakura 'Pendula' (syn. Prunus spachiana 'Pendula'), Weeping Japanese Cherry 
 Prunus itosakura 'Pendula Rosea' (syn. Prunus spachiana 'Pendula Rosea'), Weeping Spring Cherry
 Prunus itosakura 'Pendula Rubra' (syn. Prunus spachiana 'Pendula Rubra'), Red Weeping Spring Cherry
 Prunus mume 'Pendula', Weeping Flowering Apricot
 Prunus × subhirtella 'Pendula Plena Rosea', Weeping Higan Cherry
 Pyrus salicifolia 'Pendula', Weeping Willow-leaved Pear
 Salix babylonica 'Babylon', Weeping Willow 
 Salix Sepulcralis Group 'Chrysocoma', Golden weeping Willow
 Styphnolobium japonicum 'Pendulum', Weeping Pagoda Tree
 Tilia tomentosa 'Petiolaris', Weeping silver Linden
 Ulmus glabra 'Camperdownii', Camperdown Elm
 Waterhousea floribunda 'Sweeper', Weeping Lilly Pilly

See also

 List of trees and shrubs by taxonomic family

References

External links

 "Top 10": popular weeping trees

 
Lists of trees